Lindsey Rashaun Witten (born April 28, 1988) is an American football defensive end who is currently a free agent. He was signed by the Pittsburgh Steelers as an undrafted free agent in 2010. He was cut at the end of camp and signed by the Hartford Colonials of the United Football League. He played college football at the University of Connecticut

High school career
Witten was an All-State honorable mention pick from Ohio who made 98 tackles and had 22 sacks in his senior year. High school is one of the top programs in the state of Ohio as the Tarblooders had 15 Division I signees in Witten's senior class. Glenville advanced to the 2004 state Division 1 semifinals.

College career
Witten played his career at the University of Connecticut
Witten was a First Team All-Big East selection in 2009. He was considered one of the top defensive end prospects available for the 2010 NFL Draft.

Professional career

Pittsburgh Steelers
Witten went undrafted in the 2010 NFL Draft. The Pittsburgh Steelers signed him as a free agent after the draft. Witten was released by the Steelers during July 2010 training camp.

Hartford Colonials
The Hartford Colonials signed Witten as a free agent on August 5, 2010. Witten never played a down for Hartford.

Calgary Stampeders
The Calgary Stampeders signed Witten as a free agent on May 16, 2011.

United States Navy
Currently serving in United States Navy, as 3rd Class Petty Officer. Rated Aviation Administrationman.

Personal life
He is the younger brother of former NFL safety Donte Whitner.

References

External links
 Connecticut Huskies Bio
 Pittsburgh Steelers bio

1988 births
Living people
Glenville High School alumni
American football defensive ends
Chicago Rush players
Cleveland Gladiators players
UConn Huskies football players
Edmonton Elks players
Hartford Colonials players
Players of American football from Cleveland